4MK is a commercial radio station, licensed to broadcast in the Mackay region of Queensland.  The station is currently owned by ARN and broadcasts on 1026 AM.

Programming  
The station currently broadcasts some locally presented programming, such as the breakfast and morning programs, which are presented by Mackay-based announcers.

However, the station also sources some programming produced from elsewhere in the Grant Broadcasters network.  This includes the 4MK afternoon show which sounds as though it is presented locally, but actually consists of pre-recorded segments compiled in Gladstone by the 4CC breakfast announcer

The networked 20/20 Retro Countdown heard on 4MK and hosted by Aaron Stevens.

Networked programming such as  Sports Day  is also heard on 4MK.

In June 2016, the results from first ratings survey in the Mackay radio market since 2003 were released.  4MK performed best in the 55-64 and 65+ demographics, with 11% and 19.5% of audience share respectively.  The station's 9am-midday morning show was the most listened to program on 4MK with 7.8% audience share.

History 
It was first announced in 1930 that Mackay would likely be home to a new low-powered radio station with 4MK as its call-sign.
.  The station went to air for the first time in 1931, commencing operation from the front room of a private residence belonging to the station owner's father.

In 1999, the 4MK branding was moved to Mackay's new FM station 4MK-FM which commenced broadcasting on 101.9 FM.  The original AM station was renamed EasyMix 1026.

However, in March 2009 the FM station was re-branded from 4MK-FM to Zinc, which allowed the AM station to revert to its original 4MK callsign.  In 2016, the FM station experienced another rebrand as its name was changed from Zinc to Star 101.9.  Unlike in 2009, 4MK's name, format and frequency remained unchanged.

In 2011, 4MK celebrated its 80th anniversary.

One of the station's longest serving employees was Trevor Lymbery who began working in the radio industry in 1959, commencing work as an announcer at 4MK in 1964.  Lymbery was an announcer for four years before moving to other roles at 4MK including being a sales manager and account executive. He retired in September 2010.

In November 2021, 4MK, along with other stations owned by Grant Broadcasters, were acquired by the Australian Radio Network. This deal will allow Grant's stations, including 4MK, to access ARN's iHeartRadio platform in regional areas. The deal was finalized on January 4, 2022. It is expected 4MK will integrate with ARN's Pure Gold Network, but will retain its current name according to the press release from ARN.

References 

Mackay, Queensland
Radio stations in Queensland
Radio stations established in 1931
Australian Radio Network
Classic hits radio stations in Australia